Vice Admiral The Hon.  Josceline Percy  (29 January 1784 – 19 October 1856) was a Royal Navy officer and politician who went on to be Commander-in-Chief, The Nore.

Family
Josceline was the fourth son of Algernon Percy, second Baron Lovaine of Alnwick (1750–1830) and his wife Isabella Susannah Burrell.

Through his father he was the grandson of Hugh Percy, first duke of Northumberland, and through his mother the grandson of Peter Burrell of Beckenham, Kent.  His maternal uncle was Peter, first Baron Gwydyr, and Henry Percy (1785–1825) and William Henry Percy (1788–1855, another naval officer) were his younger brothers.

Life
Born with a twin brother (Hugh, 1784–1856), Percy's first naval service began in February 1797, on Lord Hugh Seymour's flagship  . From there he was made 's acting lieutenant (under Captain John Gore, who was later knighted) in August 1803, and his assistance in her capture of Spanish treasure ships on 5 October 1804 led to that commission being confirmed the following 30 April.

He moved to  sometime before 1806, for he was in that ship that year with Sir Home Riggs Popham during Cape Town's capture and was promoted from it to his first independent command came on 13 January 1806, over the brig . To reach that ship he was posted to the Dutch ship Bato, then thought to be in Simon's Bay, but - finding the Bato destroyed and that the Espoir had already sailed back to England - he had no choice but to return to the Diadem. The French 46-gun frigate Volontaire arrived in Table Bay on 4 March (not knowing the British had captured the Cape), and was seized, commissioned into the Royal Navy, and put under Percy's command, with orders to reach St Helena and head a convoy then returning to England. He also received confirmation of his two promotions of 1806, which were given the dates of 22 January and 25 September 1806 respectively. On arrival in England, he became the Tory Member of Parliament for Beer Alston, Devon (a 'pocket borough' of his father's), a role he held until 1820.

He assisted at the occupation of Madeira by Sir Samuel Hood in 1807 (commanding the 22 gun ). To meet the terms of the convention of Cintra, requiring all defeated French forces to be returned to France, he transported the French general Junot from Portugal to La Rochelle in 1808, during his captaincy of the 36 gun . He commanded the frigate  along the coast of France (and later at Rio de Janeiro and Buenos Aires) from November 1810 to the end of 1815, when he sailed back to England.

He was appointed a Companion of the Order of the Bath on 26 September 1831, on the occasion of King William IV's Coronation Honours. On 23 November 1841, he was promoted to rear-admiral, acting as the Commander-in-Chief, Cape of Good Hope Station (November 1841-spring 1846) and Commander-in-Chief, Sheerness (June 1851-June 1854), having been promoted to vice admiral on 29 April 1851. He was appointed Commander-in-Chief, The Nore in 1851.

Marriage and issue
On 9 December 1820, he married Sophia Elizabeth Walhouse (died 13 December 1875), daughter of Moreton Walhouse of Hatherton, Staffordshire, and sister of Lord Hatherton.  One son and three daughters were born of the marriage.  The only son Alan (1825–1845) died young; of the daughters
 Sophia Louisa Percy (24 December 1821 Hatherton - 7 November 1908), author of Links with the Past (1901) (text) married 7 July 1846 Col. Charles Bagot (20 May 1806 - 25 February 1881), of a prominent aristocratic family, and had issue, three sons, including Richard Bagot (1860–1921), their fourth and last child, and an only daughter and eldest child Alice Mary Bagot (died 1922).   The present Bagots of Levens Hall, Westmorland are descended (through an heiress) from Josceline, the eldest son of Charles and Sophia Bagot.
 Emily Percy (12 September 1826 – 17 December 1919) married 17 July 1852, Gen. Sir Charles Lawrence d’Aguilar, G.C.B. (died 2 November 1912), and had issue, 1 daughter.
 Charlotte Alice Percy (17 July 1831 – 26 May 1916) who in 1858 married her first cousin Edward Percy Thompson (1837 – October 1879), himself son of Ellen Percy, herself fourth youngest daughter of Hugh Percy, Bishop of Carlisle (twin brother of the subject of this entry), and had issue, two sons and three daughters. The eldest daughter Grace Anne Thompson (died 1960) married 1892 her (double) second cousin Capt. Josceline Hugh Percy (1856–1910), 7th and youngest son of Rev. Henry Percy, himself the second son of Bishop Hugh, and had issue two sons and two daughters.

See also

Sources

External links
DNB entry
 

|-

|-

1784 births
1856 deaths
Royal Navy vice admirals
Companions of the Order of the Bath
Younger sons of earls
Josceline Percy
Royal Navy personnel of the Napoleonic Wars
Royal Navy personnel of the French Revolutionary Wars
Members of the Parliament of the United Kingdom for Bere Alston
UK MPs 1806–1807
UK MPs 1807–1812
UK MPs 1812–1818
UK MPs 1818–1820